Efe Gómez, born Francisco Gómez Escobar, (1867 - 1938) was a prominent writer and intellectual from Medellín, Colombia.

He received a bachelor's degree from the Universidad de Antioquia graduate degree in engineering from Escuela de Minas de Medellín

References

1867 births
1938 deaths
Colombian male writers